South Litchfield Township (T8N R5W) is located in Montgomery County, Illinois, United States. As of the 2010 census, its population was 3,408 and it contained 1,579 housing units.

Geography

South Litchfield Twp:

Demographics

Adjacent townships
 North Litchfield Township (north)
 Butler Grove Township (northeast)
 Hillsboro Township (east)
 Grisham Township (southeast)
 Walshville Township (south)
 Mount Olive Township, Macoupin County (southwest)
 Cahokia Township, Macoupin County (west)
 Honey Point Township (northwest)

References

External links
City-data.com
Illinois State Archives
Historical Society of Montgomery County

Townships in Montgomery County, Illinois
Townships in Illinois